The 2008–09 Serie A (known as the Serie A TIM for sponsorship reasons) was the 107th season of top-tier Italian football, the 77th in a round-robin tournament. It began on 30 August 2008 and ended on 31 May 2009, with the announcement of the list of fixtures made on 25 July 2008. 20 teams competed in the league, 17 of which returned from the previous season, and three (Chievo, Bologna and Lecce) were promoted from 2007–08 Serie B.

20 clubs represented 13 different regions. The most represented region was Lombardy with three teams: Atalanta, A.C. Milan, and Inter Milan. Piedmont, Liguria, Tuscany, Lazio and Sicily featured two teams each while Friuli-Venezia Giulia, Veneto, Emilia-Romagna, Campania, Apulia, Calabria, and Sardinia were represented by one team each. There was a record number of southern teams in the top division with six teams: Cagliari, Catania, Lecce, Napoli, Palermo, and Reggina.

The new match ball was the Nike T90 Omni.

On 16 May 2009, Internazionale won the league by holding an unassailable lead after A.C. Milan's loss away to Udinese.

Rule changes
The 2008–09 season saw new rules relating to the transfer of player registration introduced. Clubs without non-EU players in their squad were allowed three incoming non-EU player transfers (whereas previously only newly promoted clubs could have three). Clubs with one non-EU player were allowed two such transfers and clubs with two non-EU players were permitted one transfer and a further one if they cancelled the registration of one of their non-EU players or that player gained EU nationality. Clubs with three or more non-EU players were given two conditional quotas with the caveat that the release (as opposed to transfer) of two non-EU players as free agent would only allow for one further non-EU signing.

Teams
Three teams were promoted from Serie B: Chievo, Bologna, and Lecce. The first two earned direct promotion, while Lecce won the promotional playoffs, defeating AlbinoLeffe 2–1 on aggregate in a two-legged playoff final.

Personnel and sponsoring

League table

Results

Top goalscorers

Source: gazzetta.it

Managerial changes

 Juventus youth sector chief Ciro Ferrara was originally appointed on a temporary basis for the two final weeks of the season. The appointment was made permanent on 5 June 2009.

Number of teams by region

References

Serie A seasons
Italy
1